Serious Charge (also known in US release as A Touch of Hell) is a 1959 British film, directed by Terence Young, produced and co-written by Mickey Delamar (with Guy Elmes). It was adapted from a stage play written by Philip King. The film is notable for the screen acting debut of pop singer Cliff Richard in a minor supporting role.

Plot
An unmarried vicar, the Reverend Howard Phillips (Anthony Quayle), newly arrived in the parish, attempts to get local 19-year-old thug and petty criminal Larry Thompson (Andrew Ray) to face up to his responsibilities to Mary Williams (Leigh Madison), the naive young girl he has made pregnant. When Howard threatens to tell his coffee-bar friends, Larry trashes the room and fakes a struggle. As a dishevelled Larry leaves, Hester Peters (Sarah Churchill) arrives, and he tells her that Howard "interfered" with him. Hester is the daughter of the parish's previous clergyman and has become infatuated with the athletic and handsome new vicar. However, having earlier seen a young girl leaving the vicarage late one night (Mary, who had sought the vicar's advice about her pregnancy), Hester jumps to the conclusion the two are romantically linked and, "a fury like a woman scorn'd", chooses to believe Larry's account. Shortly afterwards, Mary chances across Larry kissing another girl, and in distress blindly stumbles across the road into the path of a car, and is killed.

As a consequence of the malicious accusation, Howard is subjected to suspicion and abuse by his parishioners, including having his car's tyres slashed and receiving poison pen letters. When his mother (Irene Browne) learns of events, knowing about Hester's romantic interest in Howard, she quickly comprehends the situation, takes Hester to task, and persuades her to accept Howard's account. Larry duly receives his come-uppance at the hands of his father.

Production
The film includes a film debut by Cliff Richard, at that time a teenage pop idol, as Larry Thompson's younger brother, Curley. Richard sings three songs, although none is heard in its entirety: "No Turning Back", "Mad About You", and "Living Doll" (the latter is a different version from that which became a No. 1 hit in the British charts).

A fellow delinquent character was played by another 1950s rock and roll star, the uncredited Jess Conrad in an early acting performance.

Cast
 Anthony Quayle as Reverend Howard Phillips
 Sarah Churchill as Hester Peters
 Andrew Ray as Larry Thompson
 Irene Browne as Mrs. Phillips
 Percy Herbert as Mr. Thompson
 Noel Howlett as Reverend Peters
 Wensley Pithey as Police Sergeant
 Leigh Madison as Mary Williams
 Judith Furse as Probation Officer
 Jean Cadell as Almshouse Matron
 Wilfrid Brambell as Verger
 Olive Sloane as Mrs. Browning
 George Roderick as Fishmonger
 Cliff Richard as Curley Thompson
 Liliane Brousse as Michelle
 Wilfred Pickles as chairman of the court [uncredited]
 Philip Lowrie as a member of Larry's gang [uncredited]
 Jess Conrad as a Teddy Boy [uncredited]
 Marie Devereux as the attractive girl in the coffee bar [uncredited]

Reception
According to Kinematograph Weekly the film performed "better than average" at the British box office in 1959.

Soundtrack

References

External links

Review of film at Variety

1959 films
1959 drama films
1950s English-language films
1950s musical drama films
British musical drama films
Films directed by Terence Young
1950s British films